The National Alliance of Hungarian Families (MACSOSZ), is a non-governmental civil organization and a former political party in Hungary.

History
The MACSOSZ was founded by entrepreneur József Urbán Szabó in Szigetszentmiklós initially as a civil organization, which transformed itself into a party for the 1994 parliamentary election. Businesspeople László Wittman and Ádám Éliás also joined the party. The MACSOSZ contested the election with five individual candidates who received 0.04% of the votes. Following the failure Éliás quit the party to join the Social Coalition for Humanitarian Politics (TKEP). The MACSOSZ transformed itself into a civil organization again which still exists today. Urbán Szabó represented his movement in the Szigetszentmiklós local representative body from 1994 until 2006.

Election results

National Assembly

References

Sources

Political parties established in 1993
Political parties disestablished in 2003
1993 establishments in Hungary
2003 disestablishments in Hungary